Marcus Hotchkiss Crutcher III (March 31, 1948 – March 9, 2023) was an American anti-abortion activist, author and founder/president of Life Dynamics Inc.. He was from Denton, Texas.

Anti-abortion activism and death
Crutcher was the producer and director of Maafa 21: Black Genocide In 21st Century America, a 2009 documentary which contends that Margaret Sanger and Planned Parenthood have targeted African-Americans for eugenic extinction. He was the author of Lime 5, an anti-abortion book, On Message: The Pro-Life Handbook, and LTW 250, a guide to writing letters to the editor. Crutcher died on March 9, 2023, at the age of 74. He had suffered a heart attack four days earlier.

References

External links

1948 births
2023 deaths
American documentary film directors
People from Denton, Texas
American anti-abortion activists
Writers from Texas
Activists from Texas
Film directors from Texas